The Chosen Ones (Spanish:Los elegidos) is a 1964 Spanish film directed by Tulio Demicheli and starring Rafael Guerrero, Mayra Rey and Félix Lumbreras.

The film's sets were designed by the art director Enrique Alarcón.

Cast
 Rafael Guerrero as Juan Sánchez  
 Mayra Rey as Aurelia  
 Félix Lumbreras as Paco  
 Manuel Manzaneque as Miguel García  
 José Bódalo as Padre de Miguel  
 José Calvo as Apoderado  
 Manuel Guitián 
 Lucy Cabrera as Madre de Miguel  
 Ángel Álvarez

References

Bibliography
 John King & Nissa Torrents. The Garden of Forking Paths: Argentine Cinema. British Film Institute, 1988.

External links 

1964 films
Spanish drama films
1960s Spanish-language films
Films directed by Tulio Demicheli
1960s Spanish films